Luther King may refer to:
 Martin Luther King Jr., an American Baptist minister and civil rights activist from 1954 through 1968
 Martin Simões, a Portuguese footballer

See also 
 Martin Luther King (disambiguation)